Polk is an 'L' station on the Pink Line of the Chicago Transit Authority. It is adjacent to Rush University Medical Center within the Illinois Medical District in the Near West Side community area.

History
Polk Station opened on April 28, 1896, as part of the Metropolitan West Side Elevated Railroad's Douglas Park branch. In 1983 the original station was demolished and rebuilt. A Dunkin' Donuts was added to the station in September 2004.

Bus connections
CTA 
  7 Harrison (Weekdays only) 
  157 Streeterville/Taylor (Weekdays only) 

Pace
  755 Plainfield/IMD Express (Weekday Rush Hours only)

Notes and references

Notes

References

External links

Polk Street entrance from Google Maps Street View

1896 establishments in Illinois
CTA Pink Line stations
Railway stations in the United States opened in 1896